The College of Education Aizawl also known as Institute of Advanced Study in Education (IASE) is an institution for teacher training located in Republic Veng, Aizawl, Mizoram, India. It is affiliated with Mizoram University.

History
College of Teachers Education was established in 1975 and was changed to Teachers Education Approval Board in 2005. Mizoram University academic council accredited its M.Ed course in 2011. The National Council for Teachers Education upgraded it to Institute of Advanced Study in Education (IASE) in March 2012. The Chief Minister of Mizoram Pu Zoramthanga inaugurated the Mphil and Phd Studies in IASE on 9 October 2019.

Academics
The following courses are offered:
B.Ed
M.Ed
M.Phil
Phd

See also 
 List of teacher education schools in India

References

External links 
 Official website

Universities and colleges in Mizoram
Colleges affiliated to Mizoram University
Colleges of education in India